Grumbates or Krumbates was a king of the Chionitae, probably of the Kidarites tribe, an ancient nomadic tribe of Transoxiana.

Etymology 
The exact origin of his name is not fully known. Hyun Jin Kim etymologized his name as *Qurum-pat, "ruling prince"; containing Iranian element pat "chieftain, ruler" and Turkic qurum "rule, leadership, administration" which is attested in the name of Bulgarian khan Krum.

Attacks on the Sasanian Empire
The Kidarite king Grumbates mentioned by Ammianus Marcellinus was a cause of much concern to the Persians. Between 353 AD and 358 CE, the Xionites under Grumbates attacked in the eastern frontiers of Shapur II's empire along with other nomad tribes. After a prolonged struggle they were forced to conclude a peace, and their king Grumbates accompanied Shapur II in the war against the Romans.

Alliance with Shapur II against the Romans

Grumbates thus participated in the Siege of Amida in 359 CE as an ally of Shapur II. His participation to the Sasanian campaign in the Eastern Caspian lands are described by Ammianus Marcellinus, who was inside the fortress of Amida at the time:

The son of Grumbates, while inspecting the defences of Amida, was shot and killed with an arrow shot by the city garrison. Ammianus described how the Grumbates, outraged at his son's death, demanded revenge from the Romans: he compares the death to that of Patroclus at Troy. The Sassanids began the attack with siege towers and attempted to take the city hastily, but were largely unsuccessful. Unable to gain a quick victory, Shapur II had to commit to capturing Amida in order to appease his ally Grumbates.

References

Sources
Turks in Transoxiana, Richard N. Frye
Richard N. Frye, Turks in Transoxiana

Iranian rulers
Turkic peoples of Asia
People of the Roman–Sasanian Wars